Miseryfjellet (Misery Mountain), at , is the tallest peak on Bear Island (Bjørnøya), a Norwegian island in the Barents Sea. Miseryfjellet is on the eastern side of Bear Island and contains three distinct component peaks, Urd, Verdande and Skuld. These peaks are named after the three Norns in Norse Mythology. The name Bear Island is derived from the seasonal presence of polar bears, Ursus maritimus, whose population in the Barents Sea region is a genetically distinct sub-population of this species.

Footnotes

Sources 
 Bear Island: Description (1999)
 C. Michael Hogan (2008) Polar Bear: Ursus maritimus, globalTwitcher.com, ed. Nicklas Stromberg

Mountains of Bear Island (Norway)